Yurdusev Özsökmenler (born 1 January 1952) is a Turkish politician who served as the Deputy Speaker of the Grand National Assembly from 9 July to 1 November 2015. She was elected as a Member of Parliament for the electoral district of Van in the June 2015 general election from the Peoples' Democratic Party (HDP). She previously served as the Mayor of Bağlar between 2004 and 2009.

Early life and career
Yurdusev Özsökmenler was born on 1 January 1952 in the district of Lapseki in Çanakkale Province. Her mother was a primary school teacher. Özsökmenler graduated from Istanbul University Department of Anthropology and Ethnology before becoming a journalist at newspapers such as Özgür Gündem and Özgür Ülke. She later became a publishing expert at the Confederation of Public Workers' Unions (KESK).

Political career
Özsökmenler was a candidate from the Democratic People's Party (DEHAP) for the electoral district of Gaziantep in the 2002 general election. She was not elected since her party failed to win above the 10% election threshold needed to win parliamentary representation.

Mayor of Bağlar
In the 2004 local elections, Özsökmenler was the candidate of the Social Democratic People's Party (SHP) to become the Mayor of Bağlar Municipality. With 50,733 votes, Özsökmenler was elected Mayor of Bağlar and served until 2009. In the 2009 local elections, Yüksel Baran from the Democratic Society Party (DTP) was elected as Mayor in her place.

Deputy Speaker
For the June 2015 general election, Özsökmenler became a Peoples' Democratic Party (HDP) candidate from Van and was subsequently elected as a Member of Parliament. The HDP, having the right to choose one of the four Deputy Speakers of the Grand National Assembly by virtue of having 80 MPs, was allegedly initially intending to put forward Dilek Öcalan. Öcalan, who is the nephew of PKK leader Abdullah Öcalan, drew heavy criticism and it was claimed that she did not want the role. In Öcalan's place, Özsökmenler became the HDP's Deputy Speaker of Parliament.

Accusations of armed terrorism
While serving as the Mayor of Bağlar, a photo was released by an anti-PKK website based in Europe that allegedly showed Özsökmenler armed and dressed in military uniform at a PKK training camp. The individual who released the picture alleged that Özsökmenler was codenamed 'Ayşe' and the wife of Abdullah Öcalan, having been alleged to have advanced in office because of Öcalan. Özsökmenler and her lawyer denied these claims and referred to the publishing of the photograph as a 'heavy attack on [Özsökmenler's] personality'.

See also
Kurdish nationalism
Speaker of the Grand National Assembly
25th Parliament of Turkey

References

External links
Profile on the Parliament website
Collection of all relevant news items at Haberler.com

Peoples' Democratic Party (Turkey) politicians
Members of the 25th Parliament of Turkey
Living people
1952 births
People from Lapseki
Istanbul University alumni
Deputies of Van
Deputy Speakers of the Grand National Assembly of Turkey
Democratic Society Party politicians
Social Democratic People's Party (Turkey) politicians
Women mayors of places in Turkey
Mayors of places in Turkey
21st-century Turkish women politicians